Hureh Rural District is in Zayandehrud District of Saman County, Chaharmahal and Bakhtiari province, Iran. At the census of 2006, its population was 10,280 in 2,854 households; there were 10,483 inhabitants in 3,267 households at the following census of 2011; and in the most recent census of 2016, the population of the rural district was 6,398 in 2,062 households. The largest of its six villages was Hureh, with 2,548 people.

References 

Saman County

Rural Districts of Chaharmahal and Bakhtiari Province

Populated places in Chaharmahal and Bakhtiari Province

Populated places in Saman County